Cast of Thousands is the second studio album by English rock band Elbow, released on 18 August 2003 in the UK and on 27 January 2004 in the US by V2 Records. The album title refers to the song "Grace Under Pressure", whose refrain was recorded live at the Glastonbury Festival in 2002, as sung by the audience during the band's set. Participants were then invited to register their names at the Elbow website, with all responders gaining a 'credit' on the album sleeve. The US version of the album contains two additional songs: "Whisper Grass" (which was a B-side to first single "Fallen Angel") and "Lay Down Your Cross" (a B-side to third single "Not a Job"). The Japanese version includes "Whisper Grass" and "Brave New Shave" (another "Fallen Angel" B-side) as bonus tracks.

A companion film was also produced in conjunction with the album's release. It features footage set to all 11 tracks on the UK version of the album, as well as the music videos for the singles "Fallen Angel" and "Fugitive Motel". In the UK the film was released on DVD, whereas in the US it was released as an enhanced video bonus disc with the album.

Album cover
The cover of Cast of Thousands was designed by art director Rob Crane, who cited Antony Gormley's installation The Field for the British Isles as inspiration. Following the conclusion of the promotional activities for the record, the models were auctioned for charity.

Critical reception

Cast of Thousands received critical acclaim upon release. On Metacritic, the album has a weighted average score of 84 out of 100 based on 23 reviews, indicating "universal acclaim".

Track listing

UK version

"Snooks (Progress Report)" takes its name from blind blues singer and guitarist Snooks Eaglin

Japanese version bonus tracks

US version

Cast of Thousands film version
(released 3 November 2003 in UK, 27 January 2004 in US):

Disc one
As the standard album release in each country (11 tracks in UK, 13 tracks in US)

Disc two
(released as a DVD in UK, and as an enhanced CD-ROM in US)

Singles
In the UK, there were four singles released from the album:
 "Ribcage" was released as an online track in May 2003 but was never a full single.
 "Fallen Angel" (4 August 2003)
 "Fugitive Motel" (27 October 2003)
 "Not a Job" (23 February 2004)
 "Grace Under Pressure"/"Switching Off" EP (12 July 2004)

Additional musicians
Additional vocals on "Ribcage" - The London Community Gospel Choir
Strings on "Fugitive Motel" and "Crawling with Idiot" (arranged by Ian Burdge):
Ian Burdge, Chris Worsey - cello
Stephen Bussey, Catherine Browning, Everton Nelson, Maya Bickel, Alison Dods, Gillon Cameron, Giles Broadbent & Sally Herbert - violins
Additional vocals on "Grace Under Pressure" - The London Community Gospel Choir, Jimi Goodwin, Alfie, Marcus Garvey, Beckie Garvey, Gina Garvey, Cathy Davey & the crowd at Glastonbury 2002 (Marcus, Beckie and Gina Garvey are singer Guy Garvey's brother and sisters)

References

2003 albums
Elbow (band) albums
Albums produced by Ben Hillier
V2 Records albums